Khiva District (Хива тумани, خىۋا تۇمەنى) is a district of Xorazm Region in Uzbekistan. The capital lies at the city Khiva, itself not part of the district. The district consists of 6 urban-type settlements (Gullanbogʻ, Parchanxos, Iftixor, Shoʻr-Qalʻa, Yuqori qoʻm, Hamkor) and 9 rural communities.

References

Xorazm Region
Districts of Uzbekistan